In computer networking, the link layer is the lowest layer in the Internet protocol suite, the networking architecture of the Internet. The link layer is the group of methods and communications protocols confined to the link that a host is physically connected to. The link is the physical and logical network component used to interconnect hosts or nodes in the network and a link protocol is a suite of methods and standards that operate only between adjacent network nodes of a network segment.

Despite the different semantics of layering between the Internet protocol suite and OSI model, the link layer is sometimes described as a combination of the OSI's data link layer (layer 2) and physical layer (layer 1).

RFC 1122 considers local area network protocols such as Ethernet and other IEEE 802 networks (e.g. Wi-Fi), and framing protocols such as Point-to-Point Protocol (PPP) to belong to the link layer.

Definition in standards and textbooks
Local area networking standards such as Ethernet and IEEE 802.3 specifications use terminology from the seven-layer OSI model rather than the TCP/IP model. The TCP/IP model, in general, does not consider physical specifications, rather it assumes a working network infrastructure that can deliver media-level frames on the link. Therefore, RFC 1122 and RFC 1123, the definition of the TCP/IP model, do not discuss hardware issues and physical data transmission and set no standards for those aspects. Some textbook authors have supported the interpretation that physical data transmission aspects are part of the link layer.  Others assumed that physical data transmission standards are not considered communication protocols, and are not part of the TCP/IP model. These authors assume a hardware layer or physical layer below the link layer, and several of them adopt the OSI term data link layer instead of link layer in a modified description of layering. In the predecessor to the TCP/IP model, the ARPAnet Reference Model (RFC 908, 1982), aspects of the link layer are referred to by several poorly defined terms, such as network-access layer, network-access protocol, as well as network layer, while the next higher layer is called internetwork layer. In some modern textbooks, network-interface layer, host-to-network layer and network-access layer occur as synonyms either to the link layer or the data link layer, often including the physical layer.

Link layer protocols
The link layer in the TCP/IP model is a descriptive realm of networking protocols that operate only on the local network segment (link) that a host is connected to. Such protocol packets are not routed to other networks. The link layer includes the protocols that define communication between local (on-link) network nodes which fulfill the purpose of maintaining link states between the local nodes, such as the local network topology, and that usually use protocols that are based on the framing of packets specific to the link types.

The core protocols specified by the Internet Engineering Task Force (IETF) in this layer are the Address Resolution Protocol (ARP), the Reverse Address Resolution Protocol (RARP), and the Neighbor Discovery Protocol (NDP), which is a facility delivering similar functionality as ARP for IPv6.

Relation to OSI model
The link layer of the TCP/IP model is often compared directly with the combination of the data link layer and the physical layer in the Open Systems Interconnection (OSI) protocol stack. Although they are congruent to some degree in technical coverage of protocols, they are not identical. The link layer in TCP/IP is still wider in scope and in principle a different concept and terminology of classification. This may be observed when certain protocols, such as ARP, which is confined to the link layer in the TCP/IP model, is often said to fit between OSI's data link layer and the network layer. In general, direct or strict comparisons should be avoided, because the layering in TCP/IP is not a principal design criterion and in general, is considered to be "harmful" (RFC 3439).

Another term sometimes encountered, network access layer, tries to suggest the closeness of this layer to the physical network. However, this use is misleading and non-standard, since the link layer implies functions that are wider in scope than just network access. Important link layer protocols are used to probe the topology of the local network, discover routers and neighboring hosts, i.e. functions that go well beyond network access.

IETF standards

See also
 Carrier-sense multiple access
 Carrier-sense multiple access with collision detection

References

External links

 IEEE 802 Standards

Internet Protocol
Internet Standards
Link protocols